Walik (also Romanized as Walīk)  is a village in Sajjadrud Rural District, Bandpey-ye Sharqi District, Babol County, Mazandaran Province, Iran. At the 2006 census, its population was 161, in 43 families.

Etymology 

Walik is a native plant of Caspian Hyrcanian mixed forests. It gives small black fruits in autumn. Once the village was covered by dense forest of this tree.

People 

Most Residents are farmers and cattle holders. There was little educated in the village in the past but right now there are even several PhD and  postgraduate.

Facility 

The village has potable water, connected to electricity, gas and telephone network of Iran. Moreover, the area is in full coverage of mobile network of Iran (Hamrah-e-Aval, Irancell, Rightel).

References 

Populated places in Babol County